Cormac McAdam (born December 1968) is a former Gaelic footballer who played as a goalkeeper for Lisnaskea Emmetts and the Fermanagh county team.

Nicknamed "Cat", he captained his county to an All-Ireland B Football Championship in 1996. The Irish News described McAdam as "arguably Fermanagh's finest-ever goalkeeper".

McAdam also played for Donegal Boston.

In February 2007 while working with his plastering company he fell from a height breaking his back and became confined to wheelchair. He is married to Christine and they have three children.

References

1960s births
Living people
Donegal Boston Gaelic footballers
Fermanagh inter-county Gaelic footballers
Gaelic football goalkeepers